Pandlr is a Brazilian website and social networking service for discussion forums. The main forum, PAN, is destined for the LGBT community that discusses pop culture and the entertainment industry.

History 
Pandlr emerged in 2005 as Jovem Pan community in Orkut, dedicated to Jovem Pan Radio. As the end of Orkut in 2014, the community was no longer using the name Jovem Pan and went through websites like Grupia, Yoble and VK, but only has received a own website in March 2015, which has moved on from being a general pop culture forum to become a social network, being renamed to Pandlr. The website became popular on the Brazilian internet for creating several memes in GIF format, like of the Brazilian singer Gretchen. In 2017, Pandlr gained Brazilian and international media attention after a forum member created several GIFs of the character Cuca, from the Brazilian television series Sítio do Picapau Amarelo, which went viral and became memes. The newspapers The South African and Highsnobiety considered the memes created in Pandlr as one of the bests of that year. In 2018, the forum became involved in a controversy with the rapper Azealia Banks, after Pandlr's Twitter profile declared that Banks "is very unprepared for the music industry, despite having talent". In February 2018, the forum gained more media attention when it spread a rumor that singer Selena Gomez would have been invited to perform at the Super Bowl halftime show in the following year.

See also 
 List of Internet forums

References

External links 
 
 

Social networking services
Music Internet forums
Entertainment Internet forums
Internet properties established in 2015